At-Tayba is a Palestinian village in the West Bank, located 18 km northwest of the city of Jenin in the northern West Bank, and 2 km east of Umm el-Fahm in Israel. According to the Palestinian Central Bureau of Statistics, the town had a population of 2,386 inhabitants in mid-year 2006.

History
The current village was covering as of 2016 the slopes surrounding an ancient khirba (ruined village), Khirbet et-Taiybeh. The ancient village only covered the southern slope of a hill and the ravine to its south. Excavations indicate that it was mainly active in the Late Roman, Byzantine, and Medieval periods, with lesser findings from the Persian, Early Muslim and Ottoman periods.

Ottoman period
All of Palestine was incorporated into the Ottoman Empire in 1517.

Zertal writes that after no mention of the village in Medieval sources, a "Tayyiba" of six Muslim households appears in the Ottoman census of 1596, but he found no proof that this is the same settlement as the future Khirbet et-Taiybeh, known today as At-Tayba. Hütteroth and Abdulfattah also mention the 1596 tax register with "Tayyiba" being part of the nahiya (subdistrict) of Sara under the liwa' (district) of Lajjun, with a population of 6 Muslim households. The villagers paid a fixed tax rate of 25% on agricultural products, including wheat, barley, summer crops, olive trees, beehives and/or goats, in addition to occasional revenues; a total of 3,500 akçe.

In 1882 the PEF's Survey of Western Palestine found here "a modern ruined village with springs."

Jordanian period
In the wake of the 1948 Arab–Israeli War, and after the 1949 Armistice Agreements, At-Tayba came under Jordanian rule.

The Jordanian census of 1961 found 467 inhabitants in Taiyiba.

Post-1967
Since the Six-Day War in 1967, At-Tayba has been under Israeli occupation.

Footnotes

Bibliography

External links
Welcome To Kh. al-Tayiba at palestineremembered.com
Survey of Western Palestine, Map 8: IAA, Wikimedia commons 

Villages in the West Bank
Jenin Governorate
Municipalities of the State of Palestine